is a 1998 Japanese video game for the Sega Saturn. It followed Tempo for the Sega 32X and Tempo Jr. for the Game Gear. The game uses stylized 2D cartoon graphics.

Development 
Super Tempo is a sequel to the Sega 32X title Tempo, and marks the third and final game in the Tempo series. The series was developed by RED Company, who also developed the Sakura Taisen and Bonk's Adventure series of games. The game was featured at the 1998 Tokyo Game Show video game convention.

Gameplay 
The game offers 2D platforming sections, as well as musical themed rhythm sections. Players take control of the character Tempo, who can create bubbles to defeat enemies. Musical notes are collected throughout the stages, and if enough are found, they can be exchanged in an arcade to play mini-games.

Release 
Super Tempo was released on April 29, 1998 for the Sega Saturn and was published by MediaQuest.

Reception 

Famitsu gave the game a score of 25 out of 40.

Three reviewers for the Japanese publication Sega Saturn Magazine gave the game a score of 8, 6, and 5, for a total of 19 out of 30.

The UK Sega Saturn Magazine compared the game to the game Rayman, however noting that Rayman was the better game and cheaper than importing a game from Japan. They noted the graphics were "colorful", however they seemed rather basic and said it looked too similar to 16 bit games. They also said that some stages were inappropriate for children, including a pet cemetery stage that includes the ghosts of dead yard animals.

Gamers' Republic gave the game a B.

Acao Games gave it 7.5/10, praising the graphics, and comparing it to Rayman.

References 

1998 video games
Red Entertainment games
Aspect Co. games
Platform games
Sega Saturn games
Sega Saturn-only games
Japan-exclusive video games
Video games about insects
Video games developed in Japan
Single-player video games